The Cathedral of Saint John in Chiayi, also known as St. John's Cathedral is the cathedral church of the Roman Catholic Diocese of Chiayi. It is located at 62nd Street Minchuan, East District, Chiayi City, Taiwan.

It is the mother church for Roman Rite worshipers in the diocese of Chiayi, also written Kiayi or (Dioecesis Kiayiensis; 天主教嘉義教區) which was raised to its current status in 1962 by the bull "Cum Apostolica" by Pope John XXIII. It is under the pastoral responsibility of Bishop Thomas Chung An-zu.

The current cathedral was built between 1957 and 1958. It has been renovated several times especially after the 1964 Baihe earthquake, after by several floods and typhoons, and a small fire that occurred in 1997.

See also
Chinese Rites Controversy
Catholic Church in Taiwan

References

East District, Chiayi
Religious buildings and structures in Chiayi City
Roman Catholic cathedrals in Taiwan
Roman Catholic churches completed in 1958
20th-century Roman Catholic church buildings